This is a timeline of events of the pro-Greece 1974 Cypriot coup d'état and the responding Turkish invasion of Cyprus from 15 July to 16 August 1974.

July 1974 

15  – The Cypriot National Guard and EOKA B, led by the Greek Junta, launch a coup and overthrow the democratically elected President, Archbishop Makarios III, with the goal of Enosis (annexation of Cyprus into Greece).
15  – Rauf Denktaş, the Turkish Cypriot leader, tells his Bayrak radio audience that "Our duty in this situation, which we believe is a matter between Greek Cypriots, is to protect our international security, to take defensive measures and not to interfere in any way in inter-Greek Cypriot events".
19  – Whilst addressing the UN Security Council, Archbishop Makarios III accuses Greece of having invaded Cyprus: "The coup of the Greek junta is an invasion, and from its consequences the whole people of Cyprus suffers, both Greeks and Turks."
20  – After lack of international support against the Greek-led coup d'état and the Greek-installed puppet president Nikos Sampson, Turkey invades the island of Cyprus. Two Cyprus Navy motor torpedo boats, the T1 and the T3, are sent out from Kyrenia to engage the Turkish naval flotilla approaching the shore. Both ships are sunk by combined Turkish air and naval attack.
20  – Greek Cypriot forces launch an organised counter-attack against the Turkish beachhead at Kyrenia, supported by T-34 tanks, but this ultimately fails to dislodge the Turkish landing force. Four Greek-Cypriot T-34 tanks and two armoured vehicles are destroyed by Turkish infantry and air attacks.
20  – The Cypriot National Guard, supported by all available T-34 tanks, as well as Greek ELDYK forces, launch a massive attack against the Turkish Cypriot enclave at Kioneli, attempting to prevent Turkish forces from forming a bridgehead to Nicosia. This attack fails and two Greek-Cypriot T-34 tanks are destroyed.
20  – At around 10:00, 450 EOKA-B fighters of the 203rd reserve infantry battalion attacked the Turkish Cypriot enclave at Limassol, where approximately 1,000 lightly armed inhabitants were situated. Simultaneously, 100 EOKA-B fighters engaged the Turkish Cypriot enclave of Avdimou, west of Limassol, rounding up Turkish Cypriots as POWs to be taken to the main stadium at Limassol.
20  – At around 17:00, the Greek landing craft vessel Lesvos (L-172) commanded by Lt Cdr E. Handrinos arrived at Paphos and began to shell Turkish-Cypriot positions at the enclave close to the harbour with her 40mm anti-aircraft guns. The vessel then unloaded some 450 troops of the ELDYK replacement force at Paphos, and immediately headed back out to sea to evade the enemy. Lesvos was interpreted by the Turks as part of a larger task force, ultimately leading to the arrival of the three Turkish destroyers which the Turkish Air Force mistakenly attacked.
20  – Cypriot National Guard commando and infantry forces launch a coordinated attack against the Turkish enclave of Agyrta-Nicosia, encircling the northern flanks in an effort to isolate it. Turkish parachutists are dropped in and around the enclave in order to reinforce it, leading to heavy infantry losses at Mia Milia, where they are accidentally dropped on Greek Cypriot defensive lines.
20  – At around 22:00, the Turkish Cypriot militia in Paphos issued a general surrender. At the same time, Turkish Cypriot militia and civilians in Famagusta took cover behind the walls of the old city and prepared for a siege.
20  – The United Nations Security Council passes Resolution 353, demanding immediate withdrawal of "foreign military personnel present otherwise than under the authority of international agreements" and urges negotiations between Greece, Turkey, and the United Kingdom to take place.
21  – The Turkish destroyer D-354 Kocatepe is subjected to friendly fire from Turkish warplanes and sunk after being mistaken for a Greek ship. Two other destroyers are also damaged in the attack.
21  – Cypriot National Guard forces deploy around Kyrenia and begin to form defensive lines on the Kyrenia-Karavas road, and also at Trimithi.
21  – Heavy fighting takes place in the Pentedaktylos mountains between Greek Cypriot mountain commando forces and Turkish forces. The Greek Cypriots take Aspri Moutti, while the Turks take control of Ag. Ilariona, both sides using them as support positions.
21  – Greek Cypriot mountain commandos are ordered to begin leaving the Pentedaktylos mountains in order to secure other objectives. The Cypriot National Guard captures the village of Pileri.
21  - An attempt is made to assassinate the Greek Cypriot Naval Commander as he travels to Karavas on the Mirtou-Asomatou road. The attempt, mounted by Turkish paratroopers, fails.
21  - At the Agyrta-Nicosia pass, the Greek Cypriot mountain commando forces achieved their objectives, with the 31MK and 33MK arriving from the west to capture the Kotsakagia mountain top, while the 32MK arrive from the east to force a Turkish retreat from the pass.
21  - At around 06:00, all Turkish-Cypriot resistance at Limassol collapsed under the weight of a Greek Cypriot assault, and approximately 1,000 POWs were taken. Meanwhile, the Turkish-Cypriot held village of Pileri was captured by the 231st Infantry battalion.
22  – Turkish landing ships reach the beachhead and begin unloading M47 and M48 main battle tanks as well as supporting equipment. The Greek Cypriot forces in the area are unable to contain the new landing force and retreat.
22  – An attempt by Turkish landing craft to land at Kyrenia harbour fails. Cypriot National Guard forces retreat towards Kyrenia, under pressure from Turkish armoured forces.
22  – Turkish Prime Minister, Bülent Ecevit, calls upon the UN to "stop the Genocide of Turkish Cypriots".
22  – The last defences at Kyrenia collapse. Greek Cypriot forces trapped in the castle manage to escape out of the city.
22  – Operation Niki: A flight of Greek Noratlas planes, bringing reinforcements from Greece, encounter friendly fire from Greek defenders at Nicosia International Airport, causing heavy casualties. Turkish forces successfully create a bridgehead between Kyrenia and Agyrta-Nicosia, forcing Cypriot National Guard forces to retreat south.
23  – The Greek-installed president Nikos Sampson is removed from office and replaced with Glafkos Clerides. The coup regime ends. A general ceasefire is declared, but in many parts of the island, this is not adhered to.
23  – The Greek A Commando (35MK Commando) Force based at the Archbishop School in Nicosia was given its orders – the battalion force of three commando LOK companies (41, 42, 43 LOK) was to be transported immediately to Nicosia International Airport to defend it from an anticipated attack by Turkish forces moving through the Kyrenia-Nicosia bridgehead. The airport was already defended by a company of Greek Cypriot commandos, a company of ELDYK infantry and a company of Airport paramilitary police, the latter equipped with anti-tank weapons and five M8 Greyhound armoured vehicles.
23  – The forces of A Commando arrived at Nicosia Airport just in time to mount a defence, via old city buses. They assumed fighting positions in and around the main terminal building, as a convoy of Turkish vehicles arrived at the north end of the airport, about 500 metres from the defenders. The main plan was to cooperate with the Greek Cypriot LOK in deploying a number of machine guns and anti-tank weapons (the Greeks had three 90mm EM69s), and allow the Turkish force to advance into the path of overlapping fire. However, the Turkish advance units spotted some of the enemy positions and commenced a general attack from the north.

The initial wave of around a company of Turkish infantry attack was blunted by heavy weapons and small arms fire from the 42 LOK and 43 LOK to the south, while the 41 LOK opened fire from the terminal on the flank. Conceding defeat, the Turks fell back to their original positions with significant casualties. The latter then regrouped and advanced again in battalion strength towards the positions of the 42 and 43 LOKs, braving a withering hail of bullets. In turn, the Turks commenced fire from their rear-line with a  mortar from the direction of an adjacent UN encampment. The Greek Cypriots now launched a counter-attack against the Turkish infantry within the airport perimeter by assaulting the ground troops with their five M8 Greyhound armoured vehicles.

The Turkish forces based near the UN camp were targeted by the Greek 41 LOK, which fired M79 phosphorus grenades at them in order to cause a bush fire and smoke. A 90mm anti-tank rocket was also fired in the direction of a suspected observation post in a house on the northern edge of the airport, forcing it to be abandoned. Before the Canadian UN forces arrived, two Turkish M47 tanks attempted a diversionary attack to the eastern terminal. Defenders subsequently destroyed both with an M20 Super Bazooka. crew.
25  – The first Geneva talks begin between the foreign ministers of the guarantor powers (Greece, Turkey, and the United Kingdom) to discuss the situation on the island.
26  – Turkish forces occupy the villages of St Ermolaos and Sisklipos, as well as the pass of St Pavlos.
27  – The village of St Ermalaos is briefly recaptured by Cypriot National Guard forces.
28  – Cypriot National Guard forces retreat from St Ermolaos after holding the area for more than three days against sustained Turkish assault.
29  – Council of Europe passes Resolution 573 condemning the Greek coup d'état in Cyprus and acknowledging Turkey's right to intervene to restore the pre-coup democratic regime in accordance with Article 4 of the Guarantee Treaty of 1960. Resolution 573 also calls on Turkey, as a signatory state, "to guarantee the sovereignty, territorial integrity and security of Cyprus".

August 1974 

1  – Heavy fighting at Karavas. One Turkish M47 tank is reported destroyed by an AT-3 Sagger anti-tank guided weapon.
2  – The Battle of Kornos Hill results in a minor victory for the Cypriot National Guard, with an ambush capturing an M47 tank, "092273", and an M113 APC, "239943", while destroying an M47 tank and an M113 APC with recoilless rifle fire. (Vlassis, 2004)
6  – Turkish forces of the 28th Division attack Lapithos and Karavas in the north of the island. Fighting in the general area progresses south, and continues until after 14 August.
8  – Turkish forces occupy Lapithos after two days of resistance there by Greek Cypriot forces.
10  – The second Geneva conference is held, during which time Glafcos Clerides and Rauf Denktaş meet to discuss the situation on the island.
14  – Turkish forces commence the second stage of their operation, known as "Atilla-II", contravening the UN ceasefire.
14  – Massacres of civilians in 3 Turkish villages - Maratha, Santalaris and Aloda.
14  – The 28th and 39th Divisions of the Turkish Army advance beyond their previously observed UN ceasefire lines and engage in three days of assault against the Cypriot National Guard. Morphou and Lefka both fall to Turkish forces.
15  – The last defences at Famagusta (Varosha) collapse, and Greek Cypriot forces withdraw to Larnaca. Two Turkish M47 tanks are reported destroyed by M40A1 recoilless rifle fire at Vasilia.
15  – In Nicosia, Turkish and Greek Cypriot tanks encounter each other in the only known tank-to-tank battle of the conflict. One Turkish M47 is reportedly destroyed by fire from three T-34's, and a number of other Turkish M47's are forced to retreat under artillery fire.
16  – Turkish forces advance as far as the "Green line", a predetermined territorial occupation by which time, 37% of the island is now under Turkish control.
16  - The United Nations Security Council Resolution 360 was adopted and declared their respect for the sovereignty, independence and territorial integrity of the Republic of Cyprus, and formally recorded its disapproval of the unilateral military actions taken against it by Turkey.

See also
 Military operations during the Turkish invasion of Cyprus
 Battle of Pentemili beachhead (1974)
 Reported military losses during the invasion of Cyprus (1974)
 Cyprus Air Forces
 Cyprus Navy and Marine Police
 List of military equipment of Cyprus
 Cyprus dispute

References

Sources
 Cypriot National Guard Official Site
 The Cyprus Conflict
"Cyprus, 1974", by T. Cooper and N. Tselepidis, published October 28, 2003 for ACIG.org.
APORRITOS ATILLAS, Savvas Vlassis
1974: The Unknown Backstage of the Turkish Invasion, Makarios Drousiotis, Nicosia 2002, 
Cyprus 1974 - The Greek coup and the Turkish invasion, Makarios Drousiotis, Hellenic Distribution Agency
Cyprus 100 Years Alex Efthyvoulou, Laiki Cultural Bank Archive
 Hellenic Nationalist page
"ELDYK Camp 1974- the Thermopyles of Cyprus" in Stratiotiki Istoria Issue 95, July 2004
Representative of Peloponnesian ELDYK (based on listed sources: The Battle of Cyprus (G.P. Sergis (Colonel ret.)), Waiting for Attila (Har. Haralampopopoulos (Vice general ret.)), For Cyprus (Ministry of Defence), He called the Turks (Gr. Mixalopoulos) ELDYK album 74 (Association of Reserve Officers of Kyrenia), ELDYK album).
Occupied Cyprus Project
"OPERATION "NIKI" 1974 - A Suicide Mission to Cyprus". (Mihail Solanakis).
"The Battle of the Nicosia International Airport", July 23–24, 1974
War in Peace, "Cyprus 1974", Pages 1669-1673 (P. J. Banyard).
"The Action of the Captured M47 in Atilla II" in The Unknown Soldier of Cyprus (Savvas Vlassis)

Turkish invasion of Cyprus